Aymen Boutoutaou (born 18 February 2001) is a professional footballer who plays as a midfielder for Valenciennes in the French Ligue 2. Born in France, he is a youth international for Algeria.

Professional career
Boutoutaou made his professional debut in a 1–0 Ligue 2 win over Paris FC on 13 December 2019. On 10 February 2020, he signed his first professional contract with the club, tying him until June 2023.

International career
Boutoutaou was born in France to an Algerian father and a Moroccan mother. He was called up to the Algeria U23s for friendly matches in May 2022.

References

External links
 
 
 

2001 births
Living people
Footballers from Lille
Algerian footballers
Algeria youth international footballers
French footballers
Algerian people of Moroccan descent
French sportspeople of Algerian descent
French sportspeople of Moroccan descent
Association football midfielders
Valenciennes FC players
Ligue 2 players
Championnat National 3 players